The Central American and Caribbean Junior Championships is a junior athletics competition held between the nations of Central America and the Caribbean Islands promoted by the Central American and Caribbean Athletic Confederation (CACAC).  It is divided into the Junior B Central American and Caribbean Junior Championships held since 1978 and the Junior A Central American and Caribbean Junior Championships held since 1974.  The Junior A category was open for girls and boys aged 17–20 until 2010. and for girls and boys aged 18–20 starting in the year 2012.  The Junior B category was open for girls and boys aged 14–16 until 2010. and for girls and boys aged 14–17 starting in the year 2012.

Many world-class and Olympic winning senior athletes competed in the championships in their teenage years. Usain Bolt won the 200 m event in 2002. No competition was held in 2008, due to a clash with the senior 2008 Central American and Caribbean Championships, which had been postponed from the previous year.

At the 2010 edition, a total of 532 athletes from 27 nations took part in the championships' events.

The 2016 edition did not proceed as planned following the announcement of a change towards a wider competition by NACAC regional president Victor Lopez. The new competition, due in 2018, would incorporate Canada and the United States. Lopez noted that the Caribbean region already had shared junior competition at the CARIFTA Games and that Central America already had its own regional junior event.

Editions

Records
The Central American and Caribbean Junior Championships in Athletics is divided into the Junior A
Championships which began in 1974 and Junior B   Central American and Caribbean Junior Championships held since 1978. The Junior A category (Junior) was open for girls and boys aged 17–20 (until 2010), and for girls and boys aged 18–19 (since 2012). The Junior B category (Youth) was open for girls and boys aged 14–16 (until 2010), and for girls and boys aged 14–17 (since 2012).  Records are set by athletes who are representing one of the Central American and Caribbean Athletic Confederation (CACAC) member states.

Junior A (Junior)

Men's Junior A records

Women's Junior A records

Junior A records in defunct events

Men's events

Women's events

ht = hand timing

A = affected by altitude

Junior B (Youth)

Men's Junior B records

Women's Junior B records

Junior B Records in defunct events

Men's events

Women's events

ht = hand timing

A = affected by altitude

References

External links
Full list of U-17 winners
Full list of U-20 winners (men)
Full list of U-20 winners (women)

 
Under-20 athletics competitions
CACAC competitions
Under-18 athletics competitions
Defunct athletics competitions
Recurring sporting events disestablished in 2016
Recurring sporting events established in 1974